Nedim Hasanbegović (born 22 April 1988 in Sarajevo) is a German footballer who plays as a midfielder for SpVg Eidertal Molfsee.

References

External links 
 
 Nedim Hasanbegović at FuPa

1988 births
Living people
German footballers
Sportspeople from Kiel
German people of Bosnia and Herzegovina descent
Association football midfielders
3. Liga players
Regionalliga players
Holstein Kiel players
FC Schalke 04 II players
Borussia Dortmund II players
Rot-Weiß Oberhausen players
VfB Lübeck players
SC Weiche Flensburg 08 players
Footballers from Schleswig-Holstein